Guram Papidze (born June 16, 1997) is a Georgian rugby union player. He plays as Prop for Section Paloise in Top 14.
He was called in Georgia U20 squad for 2017 World Rugby Under 20 Championship.

References

1997 births
Living people
Rugby union players from Georgia (country)
Lyon OU players
Rugby union props